Bovec ( or ; ,) is a town in the Littoral region in northwestern Slovenia, close to the border with Italy. It is the central settlement of the Municipality of Bovec.

Geography

The settlement lies in the Bovec Basin of the upper Soča (Isonzo) River, below the eastern slopes of Mount Kanin in the Julian Alps, forming the border with Italy. The adjacent Trenta Valley in the northwest leads into Triglav National Park.

It has been traditionally part of the historic Goriška region, but today locals prefer to identify with the wider region of the Slovene Littoral.

Name
During the 12th and 13th centuries, the name designated not only the settlement itself, but also the wider Upper Soča region, including the Trenta Valley. The Slovene name is derived from the Slavic form , but this itself is of pre-Slavic origin.

History
Archaeological finds in the upper Soča Valley indicate continuous settlement since the Hallstatt era. In ancient times, the area on the Roman road leading up to the Predil Pass was part of the northeastern  region of the  province. It was incorporated into the Carolingian March of Friuli, after Charlemagne had conquered the Italian Kingdom of the Lombards in 774.

With the medieval Kingdom of Italy, it came under the rule of King Otto I of Germany in 952 and was incorporated into the Imperial March of Verona. Bovec itself was first mentioned in 1192, when it belonged to the ecclesiastical , ruled by the Patriarchs of Aquileia.

Habsburg rule
The lands on the upper Soča River were finally annexed to the Inner Austrian lands under Emperor Maximilian I during the War of the League of Cambrai in 1509 and added to the County of Gorizia in the south, which Maximilian had inherited in 1500. 

Elevated to the Princely County of Gorizia and Gradisca in 1754, the majority of the predominantly Slovene-speaking territories of the province—with the exception of a brief period between 1809 and 1813, when it was included under the Napoleonic Kingdom of Italy—remained under Austrian rule until 1918, from 1849 within the crown land of the Austrian Littoral. Slovene completely replaced German as the language of everyday communication in the 19th century.

During the last Austro-Hungarian period, when the Littoral was part of Cisleithanian Austria, Flitsch was administrated within the Tolmein district (one of the 11 districts within ). The Austro-Hungarian Army had two fortresses erected along the Predil Pass road, the well-preserved Kluže Fortress in 1881–82 and the ruined Fort Hermann.

World War I

During World War I, the area was the theatre of the bloody Battles of the Isonzo, fought between Austro-Hungarian forces and the Italian Army between June 1915 and November 1917, which devastated the region almost completely.

After the war, the military cemetery east of Bovec was expanded and the remains of Austro-Hungarian and Italian soldiers were transferred to the cemetery from surrounding cemeteries. The remains of the Italian soldiers were exhumed and transferred to the Italian military ossuary outside Kobarid in 1938. Over 600 soldiers are buried in the cemetery; the graves cover the entire cemetery area, although only the south quarter has concrete grave markers. There are no names on the grave markers.

Upon the 1918 Battle of Vittorio Veneto, Bovec was occupied by Italian forces and by the 1920 Treaty of Rapallo officially annexed to the Julian March as part of the Kingdom of Italy. Under the Italian Fascist regime between 1922 and 1943, the Slovene-speaking population of Bovec and the neighbouring villages was submitted to a policy of forced Italianization. Numerous locals in turn joined the underground militant anti-fascist TIGR organization, while many others emigrated to the neighbouring Kingdom of Yugoslavia.

World War II
Between 1943 and 1945, the area was occupied by Nazi German forces, and units of Slovene partisans were active in the area. After liberation by the Yugoslav People's Army in May 1945, Bovec came under joint British-U.S. occupation. Between June 1945 and September 1947, Bovec and the entire right bank of the Soča River was included in Zone A of the former Julian March, which was under Allied military administration, with the demarcation line with the Yugoslav occupation zone running just a few kilometers east of the town.

Mass grave

Bovec is the site of a mass grave associated with the Second World War. The Cemetery Mass Grave is located next to the entrance to the town cemetery. It contained the remains of 11 German soldiers killed between 1941 and 1945. The names of all of them are known. The grave was exhumed in 2000 and the remains were transferred to Žale Cemetery in Ljubljana. Unlike most mass graves in Slovenia, the grave was well maintained during the communist era with funds provided by the German War Graves Commission. The mass grave is marked by a plaque in Slovene and German.

Postwar
In September 1947, the Paris Peace Treaties gave the town to Yugoslavia. In 1951, Bovec became a town. With the breakup of Yugoslavia in 1991, Bovec became part of independent Slovenia.

Bovec was heavily damaged by the 1976 Friuli earthquake. Another moderate quake with a magnitude of 5.6 on the Richter magnitude scale shook the town in April 1998, and a weaker one occurred in July 2004, with a 4.9 magnitude.

Economy

Tourism

The citizens of Bovec largely depend on tourism. In recent years, the area has become increasingly popular with advertisers and filmmakers; part of the Disney film The Chronicles of Narnia: Prince Caspian was shot here. The area received the European Destinations of Excellence award in 2008 with the Soča Stories project.

Area destinations include Boka Falls, Mount Triglav (2864 m), the Soča River, Lake Krn, the Kanin (Sella Nevea) ski resort, the Vršič Pass (1611 m), and the mountain road to the Mangart Saddle. Activities around Bovec include kayaking, rafting, hiking (the Peace Trail from Bovec to Kluže Fortress, the Soča Trail, and the Alpe-Adria Trail), performances by Društvo 1313, cheese tasting on the Mangart Plain, the Kanin circular cableway, Prestreljenik Window and other karst features, a zip line, and fishing.

Notable natives
Notable people that were born or lived in Bovec include:
Vasja Klavora (born 1936), author and politician

See also
Julius Kugy

References

External links

Bovec on Geopedia
Soča Valley tourist information

 
Cities and towns in the Julian Alps
Cities and towns in the Slovene Littoral
Populated places in the Municipality of Bovec
Populated places in the Soča Valley